Kis-Lyn School for Boys was a reform school in Butler Township, Luzerne County, Pennsylvania which operated from 1912 to 1965. The school housed boys who committed non violent offenses and offered a full high school curriculum.  Boys lived in cottages which were run by married couples who were responsible for overseeing the boys when they were not in school or performing chores.  Each cottage specialized in different projects on the farm: one cottage handled laundry while others handled farm chores, the dairy barn, the kitchen, and the hen house, respectively.  The boys slept in dormitory style conditions and ate at communal tables.  Much of the food provided was raised on the farm.  A typical breakfast consisted of hot cereal fortified with raisins, hot rolls and fresh milk. At lunch and dinner soups, stews, pasta, meats and fresh fruit was served. Boys who met the conduct code were allowed visitors once a month and were allowed to leave the farm with their parents or sponsors for the day.  Boys were also allowed to bring back personal items such as candy, peanut butter and other edible items. During the Summer each cottage was allowed to use the pool, play baseball and other sports.  In Winter, during school time, the boys played basketball, staged talent shows and plays or joined the Boy Scouts. Boys were allowed to watch TV and were taken on occasion to events outside the facility like the circus.

The average stay at Kis-Lyn was one year with some boys being released earlier when proper homes were found for them or when their home life stabilized.  Many boys at Kis-Lyn were there because of poor living conditions at home while others were there for low level crimes such as shoplifting. The school was open to boys of all races and religions with boys coming from all over the state of Pennsylvania including the urban areas of Philadelphia, Reading, Harrisburg and Pittsburgh.  For most boys it was their first exposure to any type of farm life.

References

Schools in Luzerne County, Pennsylvania
Schools in Pennsylvania